The Selter is a ridge, up to , in the Lower Saxon Hills in the districts of Hildesheim, Holzminden and Northeim in the German state of Lower Saxony.

Geography

Location 
The Selter is a narrow ridge in the Alfeld Uplands, part of the Leine Uplands in the Lower Saxon Hills. It is about 11 kilometres long and lies in the rectangle formed by the villages of Alfeld, Freden, Kreiensen and Delligsen. It lies between Delligsen to the northwest, Imsen to the north, Freden to the east, Erzhausen to the southeast, Greene to the south-southeast, Naensen to the south, Stroit and Ammensen to the southwest and Varrigsen to the west. Its virtual centre lies near Freden.

Hills 
Amongst the hills of the Selter are the following − sorted by height in metres above sea level (NN)

 Hohe Egge (395.0 m)
 Kohlberg (ca. 380 m)
 Thödingsberg (ca. 366 m)
 Nollen (300.0 m)
 Hasenberg (ca. 290 m)
 Spielberg (ca. 290 m)
 Ziegenrücken (ca. 260 m)

References 

Central Uplands
Ridges of Lower Saxony
Hildesheim (district)
Holzminden (district)
Northeim (district)
Natural regions of the Weser-Leine Uplands